Death on the Installment Plan is the third studio album by Numb, released on February 22, 1993 by KK Records. A re-issue was released a few months later on July 19 by Re-Constriction Records.

Music and lyrics
The lyrics of Death on the Installment Plan are about the concept of government sanctioned death and inside the album's booklet there are several dates representing the executions of serial killers in North America. Concerning the music, composer Don Gordon has said that he emphasized song structure and used straight forward drum patterns and standard dance style tempos to engage listeners. When asked about the album's title, Gordon stated:

Reception
Aiding & Abetting gave Death on the Installment Plan a positive review, calling it "floor-ready death, with the proper amounts of distortion and aggression"  and that "manage[s] to assault the eardrums with a barrage worthy of airplay." A critic for Keyboard agreed, saying "buried beneath layers of chaos, there is real craftsmanship in Death" and "ultimately, Numb will reward those who seek artistic illumination in the darkest shadows of our psyches." Staci Bonner of Spin praised the album's haunting atmosphere and called it "a disc full of distorted vocals and insane-sounding tape loops, strung together to convey deep, morbid concepts." She went on to say "Numb's not the first band to try such a thing, but it handles the task with skill — crafting hard edges and sounds which are luridly inviting, like a haunted church."

Track listing

Personnel
Adapted from the Death on the Installment Plan liner notes.

Numb
 Don Gordon – production, mixing, editing
 Conan Hunter – lead vocals, production, mixing, editing

Additional musicians
 Ken Marshall – electronics, recording, mixing
 Brad Mitchell (as Brad Facepuller) – additional percussion (8)
 Thighmaster – bass guitar (10)

Production and design
 Brian Gardner – mastering
 Fitz – photography
 Steakface – cover art
 Anthony Valcic – editing

Release history

References

External links 
 

1993 albums
Numb (band) albums
Re-Constriction Records albums